Hanzel Martínez (born 21 November 1991) is a Mexican professional boxer and the former WBC USNBC bantamweight Champion.

Professional career
In May 2011, Martínez beat the veteran Omar Gonzalez, this bout was held at the BlueWater Resort & Casino in Parker, Arizona. On February 16, 2013 Martinez was knocked out in the 2nd round of a scheduled 10 round bout with undefeated prospect Alejandro Gonzalez Jr.

Personal life
Martínez is the brother in law of former two-time World Champion, Antonio Margarito.

See also

Notable boxing families

References

External links

Boxers from Baja California
Sportspeople from Tijuana
Bantamweight boxers
1991 births
Living people
Mexican male boxers